Abdullah Nur Kaskai is a town in the Federally Administered Tribal Areas of Pakistan. It is located at 32°25'23N 70°0'19E with an altitude of 1128 metres (3704 feet).

References

Populated places in Khyber Pakhtunkhwa